Ulysses Samuel Guyer (December 13, 1868 – June 5, 1943) was a U.S. Representative from Kansas.

Born near Paw Paw, Illinois, Guyer attended the public schools, Lane University at Lecompton, Kansas, and the University of Kansas School of Law at Lawrence, Kansas. He was admitted to the bar in 1902 and commenced practice in Kansas City, Kansas. He served as judge of the first division city court of Kansas City from 1907-09. He served as mayor of Kansas City, Kansas from 1909 to 1910.

Guyer was elected as a Republican to the Sixty-eighth Congress to fill the vacancy caused by the death of Edward C. Little and served from November 4, 1924, to March 3, 1925. He was not a candidate for election for the full term in 1924. He resumed the practice of law in Kansas City.

He was re-elected to the Seventieth and to the eight succeeding Congresses and served from March 4, 1927, until his death. He was one of the managers appointed by the United States House of Representatives in 1933 to conduct the impeachment proceedings against Harold Louderback, judge of the United States District Court for the Northern District of California. He died in Bethesda, Maryland on June 5, 1943.

See also
 List of United States Congress members who died in office (1900–49)

References

1868 births
1943 deaths
People from Paw Paw, Illinois
Politicians from Kansas City, Kansas
Mayors of places in Kansas
Kansas state court judges
Republican Party members of the United States House of Representatives from Kansas